National Museum of Visual Arts (Uruguay) a museum in Parque Rodó, Montevideo, Uruguay. It was inaugurated on December 10, 1911.

This museum has the largest collection of Uruguayan artworks. Among them are works by Olga Piria, Rafael Barradas, Joaquín Torres García, José Cúneo, Carlos Federico Sáez, Pedro Figari, Juan Manuel Blanes and artist Pablo Serrano who lived in Montevideo for twenty years.

The museum also hosts temporary shows, in many cases foreign artists' itinerant exhibitions.

Exhibitions 
 1, ground floor. surface: 152 m2
 2, ground floor. Area: 1015 m2
 3, first floor. Surface: 110 m2
 4, first floor. Surface: 634 m2
 5, room, upstairs. Surface: 570 m2
 Conference Room, ground floor, with a capacity of 174 seats. Primarily designed for video conferences.
 Library, upstairs. Monday to Friday from 11 to 17 hours, focused on art, with more than 8,000 volumes.
 Garden, designed by landscape architect Leandro Silva Delgado Uruguay.

Directors

See also 
 List of museums in Uruguay

References

External links
Official website

Art museums established in 1911
Museums in Montevideo
Art museums and galleries in Uruguay
1911 establishments in Uruguay
Parque Rodó, Montevideo